This section of the list of former state routes in New York contains all routes numbered between 101 and 200.

References

 101